Youri Kayembre Kalenga (born March 27, 1988) is a Congolese-French professional boxer. He is the former WBA interim Cruiserweight champion.

Professional career
On June 21, 2014, Kalenga defeated Mateusz Masternak by twelfth round split decision to win the interim WBA Cruiserweight title.

In May 2016 Kalenga was stopped by Yuniel Dorticos in the 10th round in a fight for the vacant interim WBA title.

Professional boxing record

References

External links 
 

1988 births
Living people
Cruiserweight boxers
French male boxers
Democratic Republic of the Congo male boxers